Karin Fischer (born 7 January 1972 in Füssen) is a former German curler.

She competed at the 2002 Winter Olympics, finishing in 5th place.

Teams

References

External links
 

Living people
1972 births
German female curlers
Curlers at the 2002 Winter Olympics
Olympic curlers of Germany
German curling champions
Sportspeople from Füssen